Desert Memorial Park is a cemetery in Cathedral City, California, United States, near Palm Springs. Opening in 1956 and receiving its first interment in 1957, it is maintained by the Palm Springs Cemetery District. The District also maintains the Welwood Murray Cemetery in Palm Springs.

LGBTQ Veterans Memorial

In 2001 American Veterans Post 66 dedicated a memorial at the cemetery honoring all LGBTQ veterans. In 2018, the state passed California Assembly Bill 2439 designating the memorial as California's official LGBTQ veterans memorial. In recognition, a second plaque was affixed to the monument. The memorial is an obelisk of South Dakotan mahogany granite with the logo of American Veterans for Equal Rights on it.

Notable interments
Among those buried here are:
 Chris Alcaide (1923–2004), actor
  Dorothy Arnold (1917-1984), actress                                                                                                                                                                          
 William Milton Asher (1922–2004), American television and film producer, director, and screenwriter
 Busby Berkeley (1895–1976), motion picture director and musical choreographer
 Sonny Bono (1935–1998, born Salvatore Phillip Bono), record producer, singer, actor, politician, first husband of Cher
 Lorayne Brox (1901–1993), one of the Brox Sisters singing group
 Bob Cobert (1924–2020), television music composer
 Lawrence L. Crossley (1899–1962), Palm Springs businessman, pioneer, and first black resident 
 Velma Wayne Dawson (1912–2007), puppeteer and creator of Howdy Doody
 Brad Dexter (1917–2002), actor and film producer
 Alex Dreier (1916–2000), broadcaster and actor
 Jolie Gabor (1896–1997), mother of the Gabor sisters
 Magda Gabor (1915–1997), one of the Gabor sisters
 Louis Galen (1925–2007), philanthropist and banker
 Neva Gerber (1894–1974), silent film actress
 Bill Goodwin (1910–1958), television announcer
 Irving Green (1916–2006), founder of Mercury Records
 Earle Hagen (1919–2008), composer
 Claude Harmon (1916–1989), golfer
 Howard Hesseman (1940-2022), actor                                                                                                                                           
 Josephine Hill (1899–1989), actress
 Roy W. Hill (1899–1986), philanthropist
 Eddy Howard (1915–1963), singer
 Betty Hutton (1921–2007), singer and actress
 Jennings Lang (1915–1996), film producer
 Andrea Leeds (1914–1984), actress
 Benjamin Lees (1924–2010), composer
 Diana "Mousie" Lewis (1919–1997), actress
 Monica Lewis (1922-2015), actress and singer                                                                                                                                           
 Frederick Loewe (1901–1988), composer
 Patrick Macnee (1922–2015), actor
 Marian Marsh (1913–2006), actress
 David J. McDonald (1902–1979), labor leader
 Maurice "Mac" McDonald (1902–1971), co-founder, with brother Dick, of the original McDonald's chain
 Cameron Mitchell (1918–1994), actor
 Hugo Mario Montenegro (1925–1981), orchestra leader and composer
 John J. Phillips (1887–1983), United States Congressman
 William Powell (1892–1984), actor and associate producer
 William David Powell (1925–1968), TV writer
 Marjorie Rambeau (1889–1970), actress
 Rebel Randall (1921–2010, born Alaine C. Brandes), American actress
 Pete Reiser (1919–1981), baseball player
 Jilly Rizzo (1917–1992), restaurateur and entertainer
 Frank Scully (1892–1964) author, journalist, humorist, and columnist
 Ginny Simms (aka Virginia E. Eastvold) (1913–1994), actress
 Anthony Martin Sinatra (1892–1969), professional boxer, bar owner and the father of Frank Sinatra
 Barbara Sinatra (1927–2017), model and showgirl, wife of Frank Sinatra
 Dolly Sinatra, (1896–1977), mother of Frank Sinatra
 Frank Sinatra (1915–1998), singer and actor
 Shirley Spork (1927–2022), golfer
 Jimmy Van Heusen (1913–1990, born Edward C. Babcock), American composer
 Philip "Mickey" Weintraub (1907–1987), MLB player
 Ralph Young (1923–2008), singer and actor

See also
 Coachella Valley Public Cemetery
 Forest Lawn Cemetery (Cathedral City) – across Ramon Road from Desert Memorial Park
 List of cemeteries in Riverside County, California
 List of cemeteries in California

References

External links
 Palm Springs Cemetery District (official website)
 Palm Springs District Cemetery USGS Cathedral City Quad, California, Topographic Map at TopoZone

Cemeteries in Riverside County, California
Cathedral City, California
1956 establishments in California